Aborolabis vicina is a species of earwig in the genus Aborolabis, the family Anisolabididae, the suborder Forficulina, and the order Dermaptera. Found primarily in the Afrotropical realm, this species was first classified by Burr in 1911.

References 

Insects of Africa
Anisolabididae
Insects described in 1911